The Women's 1500 metre freestyle competition at the 2019 World Championships was held on 22 and 23 July 2019. The defending champion was Katie Ledecky, but she was forced to withdraw due to illness.

Records
Prior to the competition, the existing world and championship records were as follows.

Results

Heats
The heats were started on 22 July at 11:23.

Final
The final was held on 23 July at 20:10.

References

Women's 1500 metre freestyle
2019 in women's swimming